Onyoti Adigo Nyikec is a South Sudanese politician and the Minister of Livestock and Fisheries as of 2022.

Career 
He was appointed as a minister in May 2019 by the president among other ministers.

Controversy 
Onyoti Adigo Nyikec, who at the time was a senior member of the Sudan People's Liberation for Democratic Change (SPLM-DC) had allegedly described the Sudanese president as a "crazy" and "emotional" leader who makes public statements without taking into consideration the likely consequences, but later the party SPLM-DC apologized.

References 

Living people
Year of birth missing (living people)